Algeria, participated at the 2011 All-Africa Games held in the city of Maputo, Mozambique. It participated with 265 athletes in 19 sports and win 84 medals in the end of these games.

Medal summary

Medal table

Gold

Athletics

Women

Badminton

Basketball

Men

Pool matches

Group A

Quarterfinals

Semifinals

Bronze medal game

Women

Pool matches

Group A

Beach volleyball

Boxing

Canoeing

Chess

Cycling

Football

Women

Pool matches

Group A

 Guinea withdrew and Group A became a three-team group.

Semifinals

Third-place play-off

Handball

Men

Pool matches

Group B

Quarterfinals

Semifinals

Third place game

Women

Pool matches

Group A

Quarterfinals

Semifinals

Third place game

Judo

Karate

Netball

Sailing

Swimming

Table tennis

Taekwondo

Tennis

Triathlon

Volleyball

Men

Pool matches

Group B

|}

|}

Semifinals

|}

Final

|}

Women

Pool matches

Group B

|}

|}

Semifinals

|}

Final

|}

References

Nations at the 2011 All-Africa Games
2011
All-Africa Games